In general relativity, Synge's world function is a smooth locally defined function of pairs of points in a smooth spacetime  with smooth Lorentzian metric . Then Synge's world function is defined as:

where  is the tangent vector to the affinely parametrized geodesic . Synge's world function is well-defined, since the integral above is invariant under reparameterization. In particular, for Minkowski spacetime, the Synge's world function simplifies to half the spacetime interval between the two points:  it is globally defined and it takes the form

Obviously Synge's function can be defined also in Riemannian manifolds and in that case it has non-negative sign.  
Generally speaking, Synge’s function is only locally defined and an attempt to define an extension to domains larger than convex normal neighborhoods generally  leads to a multivalued function since there may be several geodesic segments joining a pair of points in the spacetime.
Synge's world function (also its extension to a neighborhood of the diagonal of  ) appears in particular in a number of theoretical constructions of quantum field theory in curved spacetime. It is the crucial object used to construct a parametrix of Green’s functions of Lorentzian Green hyperbolic 2nd order partial differential equations in a globally hyperbolic manifold, and in the definition of Hadamard Gaussian states.

References 

 

 

 

 
 

General relativity